Artak Yedigaryan (born on 18 March 1990 in Yerevan) is an Armenian football player who plays as a defender for Alashkert and the Armenia national football team.

Club career
Artak was born in Yerevan in a family of football players, which naturally affected his future. Also an important factor is that the Yedigaryan lived in a house that is located next to the Republican Stadium.

Pyunik
Yedigaryan is a graduate from the football school Pyunik Yerevan. Early in his career, he played for the reserves. After spending two seasons there, he was transferred to the first team. At the beginning of the 2009 Armenian Premier League season, he went on replacements, and then began to appear in the first team, but not for the entire first match. In the second round, he almost staked a place at the base. Direct participation of Yedigaryan allowed Pyunik to score a hat-trick in the 2010 season, when the team won the 2010 Armenian Premier League, 2010 Armenian Cup and 2010 Armenian Supercup.

Metalurh Donetsk
In the summer of 2012, along with Pyunik teammate David Manoyan, he held interest in the Metalurh Donetsk. Manoyan later went on to play for Kuban Krasnodar, but the game of Yedigaryan attracted the attention of the coaching staff of Metalurh. In the near future, he was to be signed a contract between the parties on both sides. On 9 July, in the conference room of a training base of FC Metalurh, the club's sporting director Vardan Israelyan and head coach Vladimir Pyatenko presented five newcomers, one of whom was Artak Yedigaryan. The agreement contract was for 3 years. He played on the team as number 21.

Return to Pyunik
In 2013, Yedigaryan was transferred from Metalurh Donetsk back to Pyunik Yerevan for an undisclosed fee.

VMFD Žalgiris Vilnius
In January 2014, Yedigaryan joined reigning Lithuanian champions VMFD Žalgiris Vilnius.

Alashkert
On 18 August 2015, Yedigaryan signed a one-year contract with the Armenian Premier League side Alashkert FC.
On 5 June 2019, Yedigaryan was released by Alashkert along with six other players.

Return to Pyunik
Ahead of the 2019/20 season, Yedigaryan returned to FC Pyunik.

International career
On 25 May 2010, Yedigaryan made his debut in the Armenia national football team. In a friendly game against the national team of Uzbekistan, Artak came from the first minute and played the entire match. Afterwards, the Armenian team celebrated the victory with a score of 3–1.

International goals
Scores and results list Armenia's goal tally first.

Personal life
Artak's brother Arthur Yedigaryan also plays for the Armenia national football team. Their father, Gegham Yedigaryan, was a Soviet football player and their grandfather Felix Veranyan was also a football player and is currently a football manager. Artak is married to a woman named Shushan.

Honours

Club
Pyunik Yerevan
Armenian Premier League (4): 2007, 2008, 2009, 2010
Armenian Premier League 3rd place (1): 2011
Armenian Cup (3): 2009, 2010, 2012–13
Armenian Supercup (3): 2007, 2008, 2010

FC Žalgiris
 A Lyga (1): 2014
 Lithuanian Football Cup (2): 2013–14, 2014–15
Alashkert FC
 Armenian Premier League (3): 2015–16, 2016–17, 2017–18,
 Armenian Supercup: 2016

References

External links
 Artak Yedigaryan at FFA
 
 
 
 Artak Yedigaryan at ArmFootball.Tripod.com

1990 births
Living people
Footballers from Yerevan
Armenian footballers
Association football defenders
Armenia international footballers
Armenia under-21 international footballers
Armenia youth international footballers
Armenian expatriate footballers
Expatriate footballers in Ukraine
Armenian expatriate sportspeople in Ukraine
Expatriate footballers in Lithuania
FC Pyunik players
FC Metalurh Donetsk players
FK Žalgiris players
Armenian Premier League players
Ukrainian Premier League players
A Lyga players
FC Alashkert players